Kalyanamalla was a 16th-century Indian poet and writer of erotic literature. He was the author of the sex manual  Ananga Ranga. Kalyanamalla was from Kalinga and belonged to the Kshatriya caste.

References

16th-century Indian poets